Geraldo Sarno (6 March 1938 – 22 February 2022) was a Brazilian documentarist, screenwriter and film director.

Life and career 
Born in Poções, after studying law at the Universidad del Salvador Sarno moved to São Paulo where he became an assistant of Thomaz Farkas. He made his directorial debut in 1965 with the Farkas-produced Viramundo, about the internal migration in north-east Brazil, which was one of the major themes in his documentary career. 

Among Sarno's best known works was the critically acclaimed film Colonel Delmiro Gouveia (1978), a mix between documentary and fiction which has been described as "the last really significant title of the Cinema Novo movement". In 2008, he won the award for best direction at the Brasília Film Festival for the film Tudo Isto Me Parece Um Sonho, while in 2010 his film O Último Romance de Balzac was awarded the Special Jury Award at the Gramado Film Festival.

Sarno died from complications from COVID-19 on 22 February 2022, at the age of 83.

References

External links 
 
 

1938 births
2022 deaths
Brazilian screenwriters
Brazilian film directors
Brazilian documentary film directors
Recipients of the Order of Cultural Merit (Brazil)
People from Bahia
Deaths from the COVID-19 pandemic in Rio de Janeiro (state)